Jules Bastide (22 November 1800, in Paris, France – 2 March 1879) was a French politician, journalist and writer.

Lawyer and revolutionary
Bastide studied law for a time, and was afterward engaged in business as a timber merchant. In 1821, he became a member of the French Charbonnerie, modelled after the Italian revolutionary organization Carbonari, and took a prominent part in the Revolution of 1830. After the Revolution he received an artillery command in the National Guard under the new July Monarchy. For his part in the Paris Uprising of 1832 on the occasion of the funeral of General Maximilien Lamarque, Bastide was sentenced to death, but escaped to London.

Journalist and statesman
On his return to Paris in 1834, Bastide was acquitted. He occupied himself with journalism, and he contributed to the National, a republican journal of which he became editor in 1836. In 1847, he founded the Revue Nationale as a collaborative venture with  Philippe Buchez, whose ideas had thoroughly infected Bastide. After the Revolution of February 1848, Bastide's intimate knowledge of foreign affairs gained for him a ministerial post in the provisional government, and, after the creation of the Executive Commission, he was made Minister of Foreign Affairs. At the close of 1848 he resigned his portfolio, and, after the December 1851 coup d'état retired into private life.

Works
His writings include:
 De l'éducation publique en France (1847)
 Histoire de l'assemblée législative (1847)
 La République française et l'Italie en 1848 (1858)
 Histoire des guerres religieuses en France (1859)

See also
 French demonstration of 15 May 1848

References

External links
 

1800 births
1879 deaths
Politicians from Paris
Moderate Republicans (France)
French Foreign Ministers
Ministers of Marine and the Colonies
Members of the 1848 Constituent Assembly
Carbonari
Journalists from Paris
French revolutionaries
Writers from Paris